Braja Kishore Goswami (born 03 December 1988) is an Indian politician who currently serves as Member of Legislative Assembly from Santipur constituency in West Bengal. He is also a prominent social reformer and religious glory of Shantipur in Nadia, West Bengal.

Personal life
Braja Kishore Goswami is son of Sri Prasanta Kumar Goswami, who is a great devotee. Juvaraj Sri Sri Brojo Kishore Goswamii started getting education at Bhushan Das Shishu Niketan School at Shantipur. Later he completed his Masters from Kalyani University in Kolkata (West Bengal) in the year 2011. His mother, Smt. Shankari Goswami is a calm and quiet housewife and also a great devotee. It is worth mentioning here that Pravupada Shanti Sokha Goswami, the grandfather of Jubaraj Sri Sri Braja Kishore Goswami also a great devotee, was a prominent religious figure as well as a social reformer. There exists a very sacred and close relationship between Sri Sri Advaita Paat, Shantipur and ISKCON (Mayapur Organisation) from the time of his grandfather. ISKCON (Mayapur Organisation) along with Juvaraj Sri Sri Brojo Kishore Goswamiji and his father observe the Holy Birth Anniversary of ‘Madhabendra Puri’, the religious Guru of Sri Sri Advaita Mahapravu, at Babla Advaita Paat (Shantipur) with a huge preparation every year. It is worth mentioning here that Pravupada Shanti Sokha Goswami just after the birth of Jubaraj Sri Sri Braja Kishore Goswamji, made a prophetic remark that “The Holy Brindavan Leela (Divine love affairs of Krishna and Gopis’) is on the way again”. Subject of Interest : Sri Sri Braja Kishore Goswamiji is very much interested to uphold the subjects like “Globalisation in the Light of Comparative Religion” and “How Could be the Politics of Religion Useful in Social Course of life” etc. Aims and Objectives: Sri Sri Braja Kishore Goswamiji is going ahead with a strong determination to preach and spread the ideals of Sri Sri Bijoy Krishna Goswamiji worldwide in a different perspective. Participation : In the year 2009, on the auspicious occasion of ‘Gour Purnima’ organised by the ISKCON (Mayapur Organisation), Jubarajji visited there with his father and delivered speech consecutively in three languages, viz., English, Bengali and Hindi and the theme was on how ISKCON and Babla Advaita Paat organised together and obviously the speech covered the teachings of ‘Mahapravu’ also. Besides, he is very often invited to various places of West Bengal and outside to perform ‘Bhagvat Paath’ and the listeners get enlightened with the real cream of the ‘Bhagvata’. Recently, a conference was organised by Gaudiya Mission Kolkata in collaboration with Mahanam Seva Sangha, People’s Forum of ‘Chaityna Mahapravu’ etc. to celebrate the birth centenary of ‘Chaityna Mahapravu’ from 7th to 11th March, 2015. He was invited there as one of the plannery speakers. There he cited about the life of Madhabendra Puri and highlighted the sayings of Sri Sri Bijoy Krishna Goswamiji on globalisation for sustainability of life. It is worth mentioning that in the year 2012 he was invited to ‘Kathiababa Math’ in Bardhaman (West Bengal) to deliver speech. There he was awarded the title ‘Juvaraj’ by Sri Sri Shashwatadas Kathiababa. At present he is followed by a large number of disciples and devotees all over India and abroad and working as a social reformer with the ideals of Pravupada Sri Sri Bijoy Krishna Goswamiji and as a ‘Sadguru’ with higher priority. He is trying to compartmentalize humanity, trying to create the awareness to uphold human values.

Political career
He represented the Santipur (Vidhan Sabha constituency) in the by-election 2021 and defeated his nearest rival Niranjan Biswas.

References

External links 
West Bengal Legislative Assembly

Living people
Indian National Congress politicians
Trinamool Congress politicians from West Bengal
1988 births
West Bengal MLAs 2021–2026
People from Nadia district